The Desert Museum is a museum in Saltillo, Coahuila, that promotes an ecological culture. It was designed by the architect Francisco López Guerra and was inaugurated on 25 November 1999.
It has a large collection of fossils and plants and includes autochthonous animals of the Mexican desert.

History 
The Museum of the Desert was inaugurated  on 25 November 1999 by then-President Ernesto Zedillo and also the directors of the Amigos del Desierto de Coahuila foundation. The project was intended to promote an ecological culture by showing the wealth of life and the evolution of species through time in an interactive way. The project was conceived in the 90's when they began to make important discoveries in the area of about the geology, anthropology, palaeontology and biology in the region, as part of a collaboration in all these work areas.

Pavilions 
The museum is divided into four main pavilions with different themes.

The desert and its past 
Due to factors such as erosion, the different geological structures have made it a been a bit simpler to discover fossils in the Mexican deserts which have helped to comprise more on these forms of life. The collections and exhibitions shown in this pavilion explore the origins of deserts. Also it is possible to appreciate the mineral wealth where the coal is the main mineral that is extracted in this region.  
Also the museum features dinosaurs which lived in the region: Isauria, Sabinasaurio, Quetzalcoatlus and a Tyrannosaurus rex 17 meters long and five meters high, as well as interactive displays about recent discoveries in the palaeontology of the region

Man and the desert: A space of meetings 
This pavilion shows mainly the habits and rituals of the nomads who lived in this region. It is possible to appreciate the petroglyphs and rupestrian paintings, which are very characteristic of this area.

Evolution and biodiversity 
This pavilion in particular, was inaugurated on 4 August of the 2005. What shows us  here are the traces of the evolution along the last 12 one thousand years, as during this period the biodiversity in this region, that has witnessed mammoths, Saber-toothed cat, Short-faced bears and Gomphotheres.

The laboratory of life 
This interactive pavilion traces 70 million years backwards, showing the greater quantity of fauna through a biodomo doing that the experience of the visitors was only. Also it has a laboratory of Herpetology in where the specialists work with the reptiles that have  in the museum.

References 

Mexican culture
Museums in Mexico
Cultural infrastructure completed in 1999
1999 establishments in Mexico